In mathematics, more specifically in functional analysis, a positive linear operator from an preordered vector space  into a preordered vector space is a linear operator  on  into  such that for all positive elements  of  that is  it holds that  
In other words, a positive linear operator maps the positive cone of the domain into the positive cone of the codomain.

Every positive linear functional is a type of positive linear operator. 
The significance of positive linear operators lies in results such as Riesz–Markov–Kakutani representation theorem.

Definition 

A linear function  on a preordered vector space is called positive if it satisfies either of the following equivalent conditions: 

  implies 
 if  then 

The order dual of an ordered vector space  is the set, denoted by  defined by

Canonical ordering

Let  and  be preordered vector spaces and let  be the space of all linear maps from  into  

If  is a locally convex space of dimension greater than 0 then this condition is also necessary. 

Properties

Give  its canonical order and let  be a subset of  that is directed upward and either majorized (that is, bounded above by some element of ) or simply bounded. Then  exists and the section filter  converges to  uniformly on every precompact subset of

See also

References

  
  

Functional analysis
Order theory